The following is a list of right-wing political parties. It includes parties from the centre-right to the far-right and ultra right.

Active

A 

 Ainar
 Forum for the National Unity of Abkhazia
 United Abkhazia

 Islamic Dawah Organisation of Afghanistan
 Islamic Movement of Afghanistan (National Coalition of Afghanistan)
 National Islamic Front of Afghanistan

 Ålandic Democracy
 Moderate Coalition for Åland
 Non-aligned Coalition

 Albanian Democratic Monarchist Movement Party
 Albanian National Front Party
 Alliance for Equality and European Justice
 Demochristian Party of Albania
 Democratic Party of Albania
 Legality Movement Party
 Macedonian Alliance for European Integration
 Movement for National Development
 National Unity Party
 New Democratic Spirit
 Party for Justice, Integration and Unity
 Red and Black Alliance
 Republican Party of Albania

 Algerian National Front
 Hizb ut-Tahrir (Banned)
 Islamic Renaissance Movement
 Islamic Salvation Front (Banned)
 Justice and Development Front
 Movement for National Reform
 Movement of Society for Peace
 National Construction Movement

 Democrats for Andorra
 Lauredian Union
 Liberal Party of Andorra
 New Centre
 Third Way

 National Liberation Front of Angola
 UNITA

Anguilla Progressive Party

 Civic Front of Córdoba (Juntos por el Cambio)
 Conservative People's Party
 Federal Peronism (Juntos por el Cambio)
 Federal Popular Union (Juntos por el Cambio)
 Fuerza Republicana
 Liberal Libertarian Party
 Light Blue and White Union (Federal Consensus)
 Patriot Front
 Republican Proposal (Juntos por el Cambio)
 Salta Renewal Party
 UNIR Constitutional Nationalist Party (Juntos por el Cambio)
 Union of the Democratic Centre

 Adequate Party
 Christian-Democratic Rebirth Party (Shirinyan-Babajanyan Alliance of Democrats)
 Conservative Party (Free Homeland Alliance)
 Constitutional Rights Union
 I Have Honor Alliance
 Homeland Party
 Republican Party of Armenia
 Mighty Fatherland
 National Agenda Party
 Orinats Yerkir
 People's Party
 Prosperous Armenia
 Ramgavar
 Sasna Tsrer Pan-Armenian Party (National Democratic Pole)
 United Liberal National Party

Artsakh Conservative Party
Democratic Party of Artsakh
Free Motherland - UCA Alliance
Free Motherland

Aruban People's Party

 Australia First Party
 Australian Christians
 Australian Citizens Party
 Australian Federation Party
 Australian Protectionist Party
 Christian Democratic Party
 Civil Liberties & Motorists Party
 Coalition
 Country Liberal Party
 Liberal National Party of Queensland
 Liberal Party of Australia
 Liberal Party of Australia (A.C.T. Division)
 Liberal Party of Australia (New South Wales Division)
 Liberal Party of Australia (South Australian Division)
 Liberal Party of Australia (Tasmanian Division)
 Liberal Party of Australia (Victorian Division)
 Liberal Party of Australia (Western Australian Division)
 Young Liberals
 National Party of Australia
 National Party of Australia (SA)
 National Party of Australia (WA)
 National Party of Australia – NSW
 National Party of Australia – Victoria
 Derryn Hinch's Justice Party
 Great Australia Party, The
 Katter's Australian Party
 Liberal Democratic Party
 Love Australia or Leave
 North Queensland First
 Pauline Hanson's One Nation
 Shooters, Fishers and Farmers Party
 United Australia Party

 Alliance for the Future of Austria
 Austrian People's Party
 Black-Yellow Alliance
 Christian Party of Austria
 Freedom Party of Austria
 Free Party Salzburg
 Neutral Free Austria Federation
 Team HC Strache – Alliance for Austria
 Reform Conservatives, The

 Azerbaijan Democratic Enlightenment Party
 Azerbaijan Liberal Party
 Azerbaijani Popular Front Party
 Azerbaijan National Independence Party
 Civic Solidarity Party
 Democratic Reforms Party
 Great Order Party
 Motherland Party
 National Revival Movement Party
 New Azerbaijan Party
 Whole Azerbaijan Popular Front Party

B

 Democratic National Alliance
 Free National Movement

 Al Asalah
 Hizb ut-Tahrir (Banned)

 Bangladesh Jamaat-e-Islami
 Bangladesh Nationalist Party (20 Party Alliance)
 Bangladesh Tarikat Federation (Grand Alliance)
 Jamiat Ulema-e-Islam Bangladesh
 National Democratic Party
 Jatiya Party (Ershad)

Belarusian Christian Democracy
BPF Party
Conservative Christian Party – BPF
Liberal Democratic Party of Belarus
Right Alliance
United Civic Party
YCSU Young Democrats
Young Belarus
Young Front

 Christian Democratic and Flemish
 DéFI
 Liberal Democrats
 Libertair, Direct, Democratisch
 National Force
 New Flemish Alliance
 Open Flemish Liberals and Democrats
 Partei für Freiheit und Fortschritt
 Party for Freedom and Progress
 People's Party
 Reformist Movement
 Vlaams Belang
 VLOTT

 United Democratic Party

 Free Democratic Movement
 One Bermuda Alliance

 Druk Phuensum Tshogpa

 Bolivian Socialist Falange
 Christian Democratic Party
 Creemos
 Nationalist Democratic Action
 New Republican Force
 Revolutionary Nationalist Movement
 Solidarity Civic Unity

 Bosnian Movement of National Pride
 Bosnian-Herzegovinian Patriotic Party
 Croatian Democratic Union 1990
 Croatian Democratic Union of Bosnia and Herzegovina
 Croatian Party of Rights of Bosnia and Herzegovina
 Croatian Peasant Party of Bosnia and Herzegovina
 Democratic People's Alliance
 Democratic Union
 Liberal Democratic Party
 National Democratic Movement
 Party of Croatian Right
 Party of Democratic Action
 Party of Democratic Progress
 Party of Justice and Trust
 People and Justice
 Serb Democratic Party
 Union for a Better Future of BiH
 United Srpska

Alliance for Brazil (Non-registered)
Brazilian Labour Renewal Party
Brazilian Labour Party
Christian Democracy
Democrats
Liberal Party
Libertarian Party
New Party
Party of the Brazilian Woman
Patriota
Progressistas
Republicans
Social Christian Party
Social Liberal Party

 Agrarian People's Union (Stand Up.BG! We are coming!)
 Attack
 Bulgaria for Citizens Movement (Stand Up.BG! We are coming!)
 Bulgarian Democratic Center
 Bulgarian National Union – New Democracy
 Bulgarian Patriots
 IMRO – Bulgarian National Movement
 National Front for the Salvation of Bulgaria
 Union of Patriotic Forces and Militaries of the Reserve Defense
 Volya Movement
 Democratic Party
 Democrats for a Strong Bulgaria
 GERB
 George's Day Movement
 Middle European Class
 National Democratic Party
 National Movement for the Salvation of the Fatherland
 Nationalist Party of Bulgaria
 Reformist Bloc
 Republicans for Bulgaria
 Revival
 Order, Law and Justice
 Union of Democratic Forces
 Union of Free Democrats
 United People's Party (Stand Up.BG! We are coming!)

 National Rebirth Party

 National Council for the Defense of Democracy – Forces for the Defense of Democracy

C

 Cambodian Liberty Party
 FUNCINPEC
 Khmer Democratic Party
 Khmer National United Party
 Khmer Power Party
 Khmer Republican Party

 Cameroon People's Democratic Movement
 National Union for Democracy and Progress

 Alberta Advantage Party
 British Columbia Liberal Party
 British Columbia Libertarian Party
 British Columbia Party
 Buffalo Party of Saskatchewan
 Canadian Nationalist Party
 Canadians' Choice Party
 Christian Heritage Party of Canada
 Christian Heritage Party of British Columbia
 Coalition Avenir Québec
 Coalition Vancouver
 Conservative Party of British Columbia
 Conservative Party of Canada
 Conservative Party of Quebec
 Équipe Autonomiste
 Libertarian Party of Canada
 Manitoba First
 National Citizens Alliance
 Nationalist Party of Canada
 New Blue Party of Ontario
 Non-Partisan Association
 Ontario Alliance
 Ontario Party
 People's Alliance of New Brunswick
 People's Party of Canada
 Progressive Conservative Association of Nova Scotia
 Progressive Conservative Party of Manitoba
 Progressive Conservative Party of New Brunswick
 Progressive Conservative Party of Newfoundland and Labrador
 Progressive Conservative Party of Ontario
 Progressive Conservative Party of Prince Edward Island
 Progressive Conservative Party of Saskatchewan
 Quebec Liberal Party
 Reform Party of Alberta
 Reform Party of British Columbia
 Saskatchewan Party
 Trillium Party of Ontario
 United Conservative Party
 Vancouver 1st
 Western Canada Concept Party of British Columbia
 Wildrose Independence Party of Alberta
 Yukon Party

 Democratic and Independent Cape Verdean Union

Movement for Democracy and Development

 Chile Vamos
 Evópoli
 Independent Democratic Union
 National Renewal
 Christian Social Front
 Christian Conservative Party
 Republican Party
 National Citizen Party (United Independents)
 New Time
 Party of the People

 Democracy Party of China (Banned)
 National Democratic Party of Tibet (Banned)

 Citizen Option
 Colombian Conservative Party
 Democratic Center
 Independent Movement of Absolute Renovation
 Radical Change

National Front for Justice

Forces for Renewal
Movement for the Liberation of the Congo
Union of Mobutuist Democrats

 Cook Islands Party
 One Cook Islands Movement

 Accessibility without Exclusion
 Christian Democratic Alliance
 Costa Rican Renewal Party
 Liberal Progressive Party
 Libertarian Movement
 National Integration Party
 National Restoration Party
 New Generation Party
 New Republic Party
 Social Christian Republican Party
 Social Christian Unity Party

 Alliance for Croatia
 Croatian Dawn – Party of the People
 Croatian Democratic Alliance of Slavonia and Baranja
 Croatian Party of Rights
 Authentic Croatian Party of Rights
 Bloc for Croatia
 Bridge, The
 Croatian Christian Democratic Union
 Croatian Civic Party
 Croatian Demochristian Party
 Croatian Democratic Union
 Croatian Growth
 Croatian Party of Rights 1861
 Croatian Pure Party of Rights
 Croatian Republican Union
 Croatian Sovereignists
 Democratic Centre
 Democratic Party of Zagorje
 Homeland Movement
 Međimurje Party
 Only Croatia – Movement for Croatia
 Party of Danube Serbs

 Cuban Liberal Union (Banned)

Movement for the Future of Curaçao

 Democratic Rally
 ELAM
 Solidarity Movement

 Alliance for the Future
 Order of the Nation
 Party of Common Sense
 Civic Conservative Party
 Conservative Party
 Europe Together
 Free Bloc
 Freeholder Party of the Czech Republic
 Freedom and Direct Democracy
 Independence Party of the Czech Republic
 Koruna Česká
 National Democracy
 Rally for the Republic – Republican Party of Czechoslovakia
 Right Bloc
 Spolu
 Civic Democratic Party
 TOP 09
 Svobodní
 Swiss Democracy
 Tricolour Citizens' Movement
 Urza.cz
 Workers' Party of Social Justice

D

 Conservative People's Party, The
 Danish People's Party
 Freedom List
 Hard Line
 Liberal Alliance
 National Socialist Movement of Denmark
 New Right
 Progress Party
 Venstre

 Dominica Freedom Party
 People's Party of Dominica

 National Progressive Force
 National Unity Party
 Quisqueyano Christian Democratic Party
 Social Christian Reformist Party

E

 Association of Timorese Heroes
 People's Party of Timor
 Timorese Democratic Union

 Coalition Movement
 Creating Opportunities
 Social Christian Party

 Al-Nour Party
 Authenticity Party (Anti-Coup Alliance)
 For the Love of Egypt
 Conservative Party
 New Wafd Party
 Freedom and Justice Party (Anti-Coup Alliance)
 Hizb ut-Tahrir (Banned)
 Modern Egypt Party
 National Party of Egypt
 Nubian Nile Party
 Union Party
 Young Egypt Party

 Grand Alliance for National Unity
 National Coalition Party
 Nationalist Republican Alliance

 Popular Union of Equatorial Guinea
 Progress Party of Equatorial Guinea (Banned)

 Eritrean Islamic Jihad
 Eritrean Liberation Front

 Conservative People's Party of Estonia
 Estonian Independence Party
 Isamaa

 Sive Siyinqaba National Movement

National Movement of Amhara

 Alliance for Peace and Freedom
 Alliance of European National Movements
 European Christian Political Movement
 European Conservatives and Reformists Party
 European Party for Individual Liberty
 European People's Party
 Identity and Democracy Party

F

 People's Party (The Conservative People's Party)
 Union Party (Venstre)

Social Democratic Liberal Party
Unity Fiji Party

 Blue and White Front
 Blue Reform
 Blue-and-Black Movement (Unregistered)
 Change 2011
 Christian Democrats
 Finnish People First
 Finns Party
 Movement Now
 National Coalition Party
 Power Belongs to the People

 Libertair, Direct, Democratisch
 New Flemish Alliance
 Open Flemish Liberals and Democrats
 Vlaams Belang

 Action Française
 Agir (Ensemble Citoyens)
 Alliance Royale
 Comités Jeanne
 Debout la France
 Democratic European Force
 Ecology Generation
 Horizons (Ensemble Citoyens)
 La France Audacieuse
 League of the South
 Movement for France
 National Centre of Independents and Peasants
 National Rally
 National Republican Movement
 Party of France
 Patriots, The
 Rally for France
 Republicans, The
 Reconquête
 Rurality Movement
 VIA, the Way of the People

 Tahoera'a Huiraatira

G

 Gabonese Democratic Party

 Alliance for Patriotic Reorientation and Construction

 Alliance of Patriots of Georgia
 Christian-Democratic Movement
 Conservative Party of Georgia
 Democratic Movement – United Georgia
 Free Georgia
 Georgian March
 Girchi - More Freedom
 Industry Will Save Georgia
 Law and Justice
 New Political Center — Girchi
 Rightist Opposition
 Strength Is in Unity
 European Democrats
 National Democratic Party
 Republican Party of Georgia
 Serve Georgia
 State for the People
 United National Movement

 Alliance C – Christians for Germany
 Alternative for Germany
 Bavaria Party
 CDU/CSU
 Christian Democratic Union of Germany
 Christian Social Union in Bavaria
 Centre Party
 Christian Centre
 Citizens in Rage
 Ecological Democratic Party
 Family Party of Germany
 Free Voters
 German Freedom Party
 German Party
 German Social Union
 III. Path, The
 Liberal Conservative Reformers
 National Democratic Party of Germany
 Party of Bible-abiding Christians
 Party of Reason
 Pro Germany Citizens' Movement
 Republicans, The
 Right, The

 New Patriotic Party

 Gibraltar Conservatives
 Gibraltar Social Democrats

 Christian Democratic Party of the Overthrow
 Ecologists of Greece
 Golden Dawn
 Greek Solution
 Greek Unity
 Greeks for the Fatherland
 Independent Greeks
 National Front
 National Hope
 National Popular Consciousness
 National Unity Association
 New Democracy
 New Right
 Party of Greek Hunters
 Popular Orthodox Rally
 Recreate Greece
 Society – Political Party of the Successors of Kapodistrias
 Union for the Homeland and the People

Atassut
Cooperation Party

 New National Party

 Republican Party of Guam

 Bienestar Nacional
 Citizen Prosperity
 Commitment, Renewal and Order
 National Advancement Party
 National Change Union
 National Convergence Front
 Podemos
 Todos
 Unionist Party
 Valor
 Vamos

 United Force, The

H

 Alternative League for Haitian Progress and Emancipation
 Haiti in Action
 Haitian Tèt Kale Party
 National Reconstruction Front
 Rally of Progressive National Democrats

 Anti-Corruption Party
 Christian Democratic Party of Honduras
 Honduran Patriotic Alliance
 National Party of Honduras

 Conservative Party
 HK First (Pro-democracy camp)
 Hong Kong and Kowloon Trades Union Council (Pro-ROC camp)
 Pro-Beijing camp
 Business and Professionals Alliance for Hong Kong
 Civil Force
 Democratic Alliance for the Betterment and Progress of Hong Kong
 Economic Synergy
 Federation of Public Housing Estates
 Kowloon West New Dynamic
 Liberal Party
 New Century Forum
 New People's Party
 New Territories Association of Societies
 Roundtable
 Shatin Community Network

 Civic Response
 Civil Movement
 Democratic Community of Welfare and Freedom
 Fidesz–KDNP
 Christian Democratic People's Party
 Fidesz
 Independent Smallholders, Agrarian Workers and Civic Party
 Jobbik
 National Self-Government of Germans in Hungary
 New World People's Party
 Our Homeland Movement
 Sixty-Four Counties Youth Movement
 Volner Party

I

 Centre Party
 Freedom Party
 Households Party
 Icelandic National Front
 Independence Party
 People's Party
 Reform Party

 All India Majlis-e-Ittehadul Muslimeen
 Shiv Sena
 Bharatiya Janata Party
 Hindu Mahasabha
 Lok Satta Party
 Maharashtra Navnirman Sena
 Shiromani Akali Dal

Democratic Party
 Berkarya Party
 Crescent Star Party
 Golkar Party
 Great Indonesia Movement Party
 Perindo Party
 Prosperous Justice Party
 Ummah Party
 United Development Party

 Alliance of Builders of Islamic Iran
 Coalition of the Pleasant Scent of Servitude
 Constitutionalist Party of Iran
 Executives of Construction Party (Council for Coordinating the Reforms Front (Iranian Reformists))
 Iranian Principlists
 Ansar-e Hezbollah
 Association of Islamic Revolution Loyalists
 Fada'iyan-e Islam
 Front of Followers of the Line of the Imam and the Leader
 Islamic Association of Physicians of Iran
 Islamic Coalition Party
 Islamic Society of Athletes
 Islamic Society of Employees
 Islamic Society of Engineers
 Islamic Society of Students
 Zeynab Society
 Front of Transformationalist Principlists'
 Society of Devotees of the Islamic Revolution
 Society of Pathseekers of the Islamic Revolution
 Front of Islamic Revolution Stability
 Modern Thinkers Party of Islamic Iran
 Progress and Justice Population of Islamic Iran
 Resistance Front of Islamic Iran
 Development and Justice Party
 Green Party
 Summit of Freethinkers Party
 Two Societies, The
 Combatant Clergy Association
 Society of Seminary Teachers of Qom
 YEKTA Front
 Monotheism and Justice Front
 Nation Party of Iran (Iranian dissidents)
 National Council of Resistance of Iran (People's Mujahedin of Iran)
 Pan-Iranist Party (Iranian dissidents)

 Bet-Nahrain Democratic Party
 Chaldean Syriac Assyrian Popular Council
 Fatah Alliance
 Iraqi Islamic Party
 Iraqi Turkmen Front
 Islamic Dawa Party
 Islamic Supreme Council of Iraq
 Kurdistan Conservative Party
 Kurdistan Islamic Union
 Sadrist Movement

 Direct Democracy Ireland
 Fine Gael
 Human Dignity Alliance
 Identity Ireland
 Renua
 Immigration Control Platform
 National Party
 Irish Freedom Party

 Ahi
 Derekh Eretz
 Eretz Yisrael Shelanu
 Jewish Home, The
 Likud
 Betar
 New Hope
 Religious Zionist Party
 Atid Ehad
 Noam
 Otzma Yehudit
 Shas
 Bnei Akiva
 Tzomet
 United Torah Judaism
 Agudat Yisrael
 Degel HaTorah
 Yachad
 Yamina
 New Right
 Yisrael Beiteinu
 Yisrael HaMithadeshet
 Zehut

 Brothers of Italy
 CasaPound
 Cambiamo!
 Coraggio Italia
 Die Freiheitlichen
 Diventerà Bellissima
 Forza Italia
 Identity and Action
 Lega per Salvini Premier / Lega Nord
 New Force
 The People of Family
 Populars for Italy
 Sardinian Action Party
 South American Union of Italian Emigrants
 South Tyrolean Freedom
 Southern Action League
 Tricolour Flame
 Unitalia

 Democratic Party of Ivory Coast – African Democratic Rally

J

 Jamaica Labour Party
 National Democratic Movement

 First no Kai
 Tomin First no Kai
 Happiness Realization Party
 Ishin Seito Shimpu
 Japan First Party
 Kibō no Tō
 Liberal Democratic Party
 National Socialist Japanese Workers' Party
 Nippon Ishin no Kai
 Osaka Restoration Association

 Islamic Action Front
 Islamic Centre Party
 Zamzam

K

 Adal
 Ak Zhol Democratic Party
 Democratic Choice of Kazakhstan

 Democratic Party
 Jubilee Party
 Kenya African National Union
 Party of Development and Reforms

 Albanian Christian Democratic Party of Kosovo
 Alliance for the Future of Kosovo
 Democratic League of Kosovo
 Democratic Party of Kosovo
 Guxo
 Serb List

 Civil Conservative Party
 Hadas
 Islamic Salafi Alliance
 National Democratic Alliance
 Popular Action Bloc

 Ak Jol
 Ata-Zhurt
 United Kyrgyzstan

L

 Awakening
 Christian Democratic Union
 For a Humane Latvia
 For Latvia's Development
 Honor to serve Riga
 Liepāja Party
 National Alliance
 New Conservative Party
 Unity

 Amal Movement (March 8 Alliance)
 Aramean Democratic Organization
 Christian Democratic Union (March 8 Alliance)
 Future Movement (March 14 Alliance)
 Guardians of the Cedars
 Hezbollah
 Loyalty to the Resistance Bloc (March 8 Alliance)
 Independence Movement
 Islamic Group (March 14 Alliance)
 Kataeb Party (March 14 Alliance)
 Lebanese Democratic Party (March 8 Alliance)
 Lebanese Forces (March 14 Alliance)
 Marada Movement (March 8 Alliance)
 Najjadeh Party
 National Liberal Party (March 14 Alliance)
 Ramgavar (March 14 Alliance)

 Basotho National Party
 Marematlou Freedom Party

 National Patriotic Party (Coalition for Democratic Change)

 Liberian People's Party

 Democrats for Liechtenstein
 Independents, The
 Progressive Citizens' Party

 Christian Union
 Civic Democratic Party
 Electoral Action of Poles in Lithuania – Christian Families Alliance
 Freedom and Justice
 Homeland Union
 Liberal Movement
 Lithuanian Nationalist and Republican Union
 Order and Justice
 Samogitian Party
 Young Lithuania

 Alternative Democratic Reform Party
 Party for Full Democracy

M

 Pro-Beijing camp
 Alliance for Change
 Macau United Citizens Association
 Macau-Guangdong Union

Tiako I Madagasikara

 Malawi Congress Party
 People's Party

 Barisan Nasional
 Malaysian Chinese Association
 Malaysian Indian Congress
 Parti Bersatu Rakyat Sabah
 United Malays National Organisation
 Gabungan Parti Sarawak
 Parti Pesaka Bumiputera Bersatu
 Progressive Democratic Party
 Gabungan Rakyat Sabah
 Homeland Solidarity Party
 Malaysian Chinese Association
 Malaysian Indian Congress
 Malaysian Islamic Party
 Malaysian United Indigenous Party
 Parti Bersatu Rakyat Sabah
 United Malays National Organisation
 United Sabah Party
 HINDRAF
 Liberal Democratic Party
 Love Malaysia Party
 Love Sabah Party
 Malaysia Makkal Sakti Party
 Malaysia National Alliance Party
 Malaysian Advancement Party
 Malaysian Ceylonese Congress
 Malaysian Indian Justice Party
 Malaysian Indian Muslim Congress
 Malaysian Indian United Party
 Malaysian United People's Party
 Minority Rights Action Party
 Pan-Malaysian Islamic Front
 Parti Aspirasi Rakyat Sarawak
 Parti Bansa Dayak Sarawak Baru
 Parti Bersatu Bugis Sabah
 Parti Bumi Kenyalang
 Parti Bumiputera Perkasa Malaysia
 Parti Ekonomi Rakyat Sarawak Bersatu
 Parti Gagasan Rakyat Sabah
 Parti Rakyat Gabungan Jaksa Pendamai
 Parti Sejahtera Angkatan Perpaduan Sabah
 Penang Front Party
 Perikatan Nasional
 Homeland Solidarity Party
 Malaysian Islamic Party
 Malaysian United Indigenous Party
 Punjabi Party of Malaysia
 Sabah National People's Unity Organisation
 Sabah Nationality Party
 Sabah Native Co-operation Party
 Sabah Peace Party
 Sabah People's Hope Party
 Sabah Truth Party
 United Sabah National Organisation (New)
 United Sabah Party

 Alleanza Bidla
 Imperium Europa
 Moviment Patrijotti Maltin
 Nationalist Party

Republican Party for Democracy and Renewal

 Mauritian Solidarity Front
 Parti Mauricien Social Démocrate

 Ecologist Green Party of Mexico
 National Action Party
 National Synarchist Union
 Nationalist Front of Mexico

 Alliance for the Union of Romanians
 Democracy at Home Party
 Democratic Action Party
 Dignity and Truth Platform Party
 European People's Party of Moldova
 Liberal Democratic Party of Moldova
 Liberal Party
 Mișcarea Politică Unirea
 National Liberal Party
 National Unity Party
 Party of Action and Solidarity
 Pro Moldova
 Romanian Popular Party

 Horizon Monaco
 Rally & Issues

Democratic Party
Mongolian Traditional United Party

 Albanian List
 Albanian Alternative
 New Democratic Force
 Bosniak Party
 Croatian Civic Initiative
 Democratic Front
 Movement for Changes
 New Serb Democracy
 United Montenegro
 Democratic League in Montenegro (Albanian Coalition)
 Democratic Party (Albanian Coalition)
 Democratic Party of Unity
 Democratic Serb Party
 Democratic Union of Albanians
 Liberal Party of Montenegro
 Ne damo Crnu Goru
 Patriotic Komitas Union of Montenegro
 Popular Movement
 True Montenegro

 Constitutional Union
 Democratic and Social Movement
 Istiqlal Party
 Justice and Development Party
 National Democratic Party
 Party of Renaissance and Virtue
 Popular Movement

 Democratic Movement of Mozambique
 RENAMO

 Arakan National Party
 Kokang Democracy and Unity Party
 National Development Party
 Peace and Diversity Party
 Shan Nationalities Democratic Party
 Union Solidarity and Development Party
 Unity and Democracy Party of Kachin State

N

 Christian Democratic Voice
 Monitor Action Group
 National Unity Democratic Organisation
 Popular Democratic Movement
 Republican Party

 Nauru First

 Nepal Pariwar Dal
 Nepal Shivsena
 People's Progressive Party
 Prajatantrik Shakti Party
 Rastrabadi Ekta Party
 Rastriya Janashakti Party
 Rastriya Prajatantra Party
 Rastriya Prajatantra Party Nepal
 Shivsena Nepal

 Belang van Nederland
 Dutch People's Union
 Farmer–Citizen Movement
 Forum for Democracy
 Forza! Nederland
 JA21
 Jesus Lives
 Libertarian Party
 Livable Rotterdam
 Otten Group
 Party for Freedom
 People's Party for Freedom and Democracy
 Reformed Political Party
 Trots op Nederland
 VoorNederland

 Caledonia Together
 Caledonian Republicans

 ACT New Zealand
 Heartland New Zealand Party
 New Conservative Party
 New Zealand National Front
 New Zealand National Party
 New Zealand Sovereignty Party
 ONE Party
 Vision NZ

 Alliance for the Republic
 Central American Unionist Party
 Conservative Party
 Constitutionalist Liberal Party
 Independent Liberal Party
 Independent Liberal Party for National Unity
 Neoliberal Party
 Nicaraguan Liberal Alliance
 Nicaraguan Party of the Christian Path
 Popular Conservative Alliance

 National Movement for the Development of Society
 Nigerien Democratic Movement for an African Federation
 Patriotic Movement for the Republic

 Action Congress of Nigeria
 All Nigeria Peoples Party
 Peoples Democratic Party
 People's Redemption Party
 United Nigeria People's Party
 Young Progressives Party

 Alliance for Albanians
 Besa Movement
 Democratic Party of Albanians
 National Democratic Revival
 Serbian Progressive Party in Macedonia
 United for Macedonia
 VMRO – People's Party (Social Democratic Union of Macedonia)
 VMRO-DPMNE
 Democratic Party of Serbs in Macedonia
 United Party of Roma in Macedonia

 Democratic Party
 National Unity Party
 Rebirth Party

 Republican Party

 Capitalist Party
 Christians, The
 Coastal Party
 Conservative Party
 Democrats in Norway
 Liberal People's Party
 Norwegian People's Party
 Progress Party
 Christian Unity Party

P

 Jamiat Ahle Hadith
 Jamiat Ulema-e-Islam (S)
 Muttahida Majlis-e-Amal
 Jamaat-e-Islami Pakistan
 Jamiat Ulema-e-Islam (F)
 Pakistan Christian Congress
 Pakistan Muslim League (N)
 Pakistan Muslim League (Z)
 Pakistan Rah-e-Haq Party
 Sunni Tehreek
 Tehreek-e-Labbaik Pakistan

 Hamas

 Democratic Change
 Nationalist Republican Liberal Movement
 Panameñista Party
 People's Party

 Triumph Heritage Empowerment Party

 Colorado Party
 National Union of Ethical Citizens

 All for Peru
 Alliance for Progress
 Christian People's Party
 Contigo
 Go on Country – Social Integration Party
 National Victory
 Peru Nation
 Peru Secure Homeland
 Podemos Perú
 Popular Force
 Popular Renewal
 Sí Cumple
 We Are Peru

 Ang Kapatiran
 Bagong Lakas ng Nueva Ecija
 Bagumbayan–VNP
 Centrist Democratic Party of the Philippines
 Democratic Party of the Philippines
 Kilusang Bagong Lipunan
 Nacionalista Party
 Paglaum Party
 Nationalist People's Coalition
 Partido Federal ng Pilipinas
 Partido Magdalo
 Partido Navoteño
 Partido para sa Demokratikong Reporma
 People's Champ Movement
 Social Justice Society
 United Bangsamoro Justice Party
 United Nationalist Alliance

 Christian Democracy of the 3rd Polish Republic
 Christian National Union
 Confederation Liberty and Independence
 Confederation of the Polish Crown
 KORWiN
 National Movement
 Real Politics Union
 Confederation of Independent Poland
 Congress of the New Right
 Labour Party
 League of Polish Families
 National League
 National Revival of Poland
 National Radical Camp
 National-Catholic Movement
 Party of Drivers
 Piast Faction
 Polish Agreement
 Polish National Party
 Poland Together
 Right Wing of the Republic
 United Right
 Agreement
 Kukiz'15
 Law and Justice
 Republicans, The
 United Poland

 Alliance
 CDS – People's Party
 Enough
 Earth Party
 Ergue-te 
 Liberal Initiative
 People's Monarchist Party
 Social Democratic Party
 We, the Citizens!

 Libertarian Party
 Nationalist Party of Puerto Rico
 New Progressive Party
 Partido Republicano Puertorriqueño
 Proyecto Dignidad
 Republican Party of Puerto Rico

R

 National Liberal Party
 Alliance of Liberals and Democrats
 National Democratic Party
 Christian Democratic National Peasants' Party
 New Republic
 New Generation Party
 National Identity Bloc in Europe
 Greater Romania Party
 United Romania Party
 New Right
 M10
 People's Movement Party
 Everything For the Country Party
 Hungarian People's Party of Transylvania
 Social Christian People's Union

 Civic Initiative
 Civic Platform
 Democratic Party of Russia
 Eurasia Party
 Great Russia
 Liberal Democratic Party of Russia
 Libertarian Party of Russia
 Monarchist Party
 National Sovereignty Party of Russia
 New People
 Pamyat
 Party of Direct Democracy
 Party of Growth
 People's Freedom Party
 Rodina
 Russian All-People's Union
 Russian National Socialist Party
 Russian National Unity
 United Russia

S

 People's Action Movement

 United Workers Party

 Archipelago Tomorrow

 New Democratic Party

 Sammarinese Christian Democratic Party
 Sammarinese Union of Moderates

 Serbian Progressive Party
 Strength of Serbia Movement
 Serbian Renewal Movement
 New Serbia
 United Serbia
 Serbian Radical Party
 Democratic Party of Serbia
 Dveri 
 Leviathan Movement 
 Serbian Party Oathkeepers 

 People's Action Party

 Freedom and Solidarity
 Christian Democratic Movement
 Ordinary People and Independent Personalities
 We Are Family
 Democrats
 Alliance
 NOVA
 Civic Conservative Party
 Slovak National Party
 Kotleba – People's Party Our Slovakia
 Republic

New Slovenia
Slovenian Democratic Party
 Slovenian People's Party
 Slovenian National Party

 Democratic Alliance (South Africa)
 Inkatha Freedom Party
 ActionSA
 Freedom Front Plus
 National Conservative Party of South Africa
 African Christian Democratic Party
 Herstigte Nasionale Party
 National Party South Africa
 United Christian Democratic Party
 Christian Democratic Party
 Cape Party

 People Power Party (South Korea)
 Liberty Republican Party
 Pro-Park New Party
 Saenuri Party (2017)
 Christian Liberal Party
 Dawn of Liberty

 People's Party
Vox
 Asturian Forum
 Navarrese People's Union
 Libertarian Party
National Democracy
Falange Española de las JONS 
Spanish Alternative 
España 2000 

 United National Party
 Jathika Hela Urumaya
 Sri Lanka Podujana Peramuna
 Samagi Jana Balawegaya

 National Congress

 Alliance (Sweden)
 Christian Democrats
 Moderate Party
 Liberal People's Party
 Centre Party
 Centre Democrats
 Citizens' Coalition
 Liberal Party
 Sweden Democrats
Alternative for Sweden 
Nordic Resistance Movement

 Christian Democratic People's Party of Switzerland
 Conservative Democratic Party of Switzerland
 Swiss People's Party
 FDP.The Liberals
 Ticino League
 Evangelical People's Party of Switzerland
 Geneva Citizens' Movement
 Swiss Democrats
 Freedom Party of Switzerland
 Federal Democratic Union of Switzerland
 Swiss Nationalist Party

 Movement for Justice and Development in Syria

T

 Pan-Blue Coalition
 Kuomintang
 New Party

 Democratic Party
 Islamic Renaissance Party of Tajikistan

 Democrat Party
 Pheu Thai Party
 Palang Pracharath Party
 Bhumjaithai Party
 Chartthaipattana Party
 Action Coalition for Thailand party
 Puea Chart party

 Ennahda Movement
 Afek Tounes
 Justice and Development Party
 Reform Front Party

 Justice and Development Party
 Nationalist Movement Party
 Democratic Progress Party
 Felicity Party
 Democratic Party
 Motherland Party
 National Struggle Party
 Centre Party
 Independent Turkey Party
 Conservative Ascension Party
 Alternative Party
 Alternative and Change Party
 Young Party
 Free Cause Party
 Great Union Party
 Homeland Party
 Liberal Democratic Party

U

 Conservative Party

 Petro Poroshenko Bloc
 People's Front
 Self Reliance
 All-Ukrainian Union "Fatherland"
 All-Ukrainian Union "Svoboda"
 Congress of Ukrainian Nationalists
 Ukrainian National Assembly – Ukrainian National Self Defence
 Right Sector
 People's Movement of Ukraine
 Revival
 5.10
 Ukrainian Platform "Sobor"
 Ukrainian People's Party
 Republican Christian Party
 Our Ukraine
 Civil Position
 For Ukraine!
 New Russia Party
 Ukrainian Republican Party

 British Democratic Party
 Christian Party
 Christian Peoples Alliance
 Conservative Party
 Welsh Conservatives
 Scottish Conservatives
 Northern Ireland Conservatives
 London Conservatives
 Democratic Unionist Party
 English Democrats
 Heritage Party
 Traditional Unionist Voice
 Reclaim Party
 Reform UK
 UK Independence Party
 Ulster Unionist Party

 Republican Party
 Constitution Party
 Covenant Party
 Objectivist Party
 American Independent Party
 American Party
 Prohibition Party
 Christian Liberty Party
 Conservative Party of New York State
 New York State Right to Life Party
 Taxpayers Party of New York
 Alaskan Independence Party
 American Solidarity Party
 Tax Revolt Party
 American Reform Party
 National Justice Party

 Colorado Party
 National Party
 Open Cabildo

V

 Union of Moderate Parties
 Land and Justice Party
 Vanuatu Republican Party
 Nagriamel

 Copei – Social Christian Party of Venezuela

 People's Action Party of Vietnam
 Vietnam Reform Party

Y 

 Al-Islah

Dissolved right-wing political parties/coalitions 
 Albania: Albanian Fascist Party
 Algeria: Front Algérie Française
 Andorra: Century 21
 Anguilla: Anguilla National Alliance
 Argentina: Concordancia, Federalist Party, National Autonomist Party, National Civic Union, National Democratic Party, People's Reconstruction Party, Union of the Argentine People
 Armenia: Justice Alliance, Law and Unity
 Australia: All for Australia League, Australian Conservative Party, Australian Conservatives, Australian Fishing and Lifestyle Party, Australian National Socialist Party, Australians Against Further Immigration, Centre Party, City Country Alliance, Commonwealth Liberal Party, Confederate Action Party of Australia, Family First Party, Fraser Anning's Conservative National Party, Freedom and Prosperity Party, Free Trade Party, Liberal Reform Party, National Action, National Defence League, Nationalist Party, National Liberal Party, National Socialist Party of Australia, New Country Party, One Nation NSW, Outdoor Recreation Party, Pauline's United Australia Party, Progressive Conservative Party, Progress Party, Rise Up Australia Party, Smokers' Rights Party, United Australia Party, Western Australian Liberal Party, Yellow Vest Australia
 Austria: Christian Social Party, Fatherland Front, Federation of Independents, German-National Party, Greater German People's Party, Heimwehr, Nazi Party, Team Stronach
 Azerbaijan: Islamic Party of Azerbaijan
 Bahamas: United Bahamian Party
 Belarus: Beer Lovers Party, Belarusian Peasant Party, Belarusian Popular Front, Civic Party
 Byelorussian Soviet Socialist Republic: Belarusian Independence Party
 Belgium: Catholic Party, National Front, Rexist Party, Vlaams Blok, Vlaamsch Nationaal Verbond
 Bermuda: United Bermuda Party
 Bolivia: Conservative Party, Popular Consensus, Social Democratic Power
 Bosnia and Herzegovina: Party of Democratic Activity, Serbian Radical Party of Republika Srpska
 Brazil: Brazilian Black Front, Brazilian Integralist Action, Christian Democratic Party, Conservative Party, Conservative Republican Party, Democratic Party, Democratic Social Party, Humanist Party of Solidarity, Liberal Party, Liberator Party, Minas Republican Party, National Democratic Union, National Renewal Alliance, Orienting Labour Party, Party of the Reconstruction of the National Order, Paulista Republican Party, Progressive Republican Party, Reform Progressive Party, Social Progressive Party
 Bulgaria: National Social Movement, United Democratic Forces, United Patriots, Zveno
 Cambodia: Buddhist Liberal Democratic Party, Community of Royalist People's Party, Khmer People's National Liberation Front, Khmer Renovation, Liberal Democratic Party, Liberal Party, MOULINAKA, Norodom Ranariddh Party, Republican Party, Social Republican Party
 Cameroon: Cameroonian National Union, Cameroonian Union
 Canada: Action civique de Québec, Action démocratique du Québec, Alberta First Party, Alberta Social Credit Party, Alliance of the North, British Columbia Social Credit Party, Canada Party, Canadian Alliance, Canadian Union of Fascists, Christian Democrat Party of Canada, Civic Party of Montreal, Confederation of Regions Party of Canada, Conservative Party of Quebec, Freedom Conservative Party of Alberta, Liberal-Conservative Party, Manitoba Party, National Unity Party, Parti bleu, Parti nationaliste chrétien, Progressive Conservative Association of Alberta, Progressive Conservative Party of Quebec, Ralliement national, Reconstruction Party of Canada, Reform Party of Canada, Representative Party of Alberta, Social Credit Party of Canada, The Heritage Party of Alberta, Union Nationale, Progressive Canadian Party, Wildrose Party
 Chile: Conservative Party, Liberal Party, National Party, National Party (1966–1973), National Socialist Movement of Chile, Union of the Centrist Center
 China: Chinese Youth Party, Democratic Party, Kuomintang, Progressive Party, Republican Party, Union of Chinese Nationalists, Unity Party
 Congo, Democratic Republic of the: ABAKO, CONAKAT, Popular Movement of the Revolution
 Congo, Republic of the: Democratic Union for the Defense of African Interests
 Costa Rica: National Republican Party, National Unification Party, National Union Party
 Croatia: Autonomist Party, Croat-Serb Coalition, Croatian Bloc, Croatian Popular Party, Serb Democratic Party, Serb People's Radical Party Party of Rights Ustaše
 Cuba: National Liberal Party of Cuba, Progressive Action Party, Republican Party of Havana
 Cyprus: EOKA, European Party, New Horizons
 Czech Republic: Christian Democratic Party, Civic Democratic Alliance, Dawn – National Coalition, Democratic Union, European Democratic Party, Freedom Union – Democratic Union, Head Up – Electoral Bloc, National Party, Party of Conservative Accord, Public Affairs, Realists, Workers' Party
 Czechoslovakia: Carpathian German Party, Czechoslovak Agrarian and Conservative Party, Czechoslovak National Democracy, Czechoslovak Traders' Party, Democratic Party, German National Socialist Workers' Party, Jewish Conservative Party, Juriga's Slovak People's Party, National Fascist Community, National Unification, Party of National Unity, Provincial Christian-Socialist Party, Republican Party of Farmers and Peasants, Slovak National Party, Slovak People's Party, Sudeten German Party, Sudeten German Rural League, Vlajka
 Denmark: Danish People's Party (1941–43), Danish People's Party (1993), Independent Party, National Socialist Workers' Party of Denmark
 Dominican Republic: Dominican Party, Red Party
 Ecuador: Conservative Party
 Egypt: Democratic Front Party, Ittihad Party, Liberal Socialists Party, Wafd Party, Watani Party
 El Salvador: National Pro Patria Party
 Estonia: Estonian Free Party, Estonian National Independence Party, Pro Patria Union, Res Publica Party, Vaps Movement
 Eswatini: Imbokodvo National Movement, United Swaziland Association
 Ethiopia: Coalition for Unity and Democracy
 Fiji: Alliance Party, Christian Democratic Alliance, Conservative Alliance-Matanitu Vanua
 Finland: Finnish Labor Front, Finnish National Socialist Labor Organisation, Finnish People's Blue-Whites, Finnish People's Organisation, Finnish-Socialist Workers' Party, Lapua Movement, Liberals, National Socialists of Finland, National Socialist Union of Finland, Organisation of National Socialists, Party of Finnish Labor, Patriotic People's Movement, Patriotic People's Party, Young Finns
 France: Club de Clichy, Democratic Republican Alliance, French and European Nationalist Party, French Popular Party, French Social Party, Rally for the Republic, Rally of the French People, Republican Party, Union for a Popular Movement
 Germany: Citizens for Mecklenburg-Vorpommern, Free German Workers' Party, German Freedom Party, German People's Union, Party for a Rule of Law Offensive
 Divided Germany: Alliance for Germany, All-German Bloc/League of Expellees and Deprived of Rights, Democratic Beginning, Deutsche Rechtspartei, German Party, German Social Union, Socialist Reich Party
 Nazi Germany: Nazi Party
 Weimar Republic: Bavarian People's Party, Christian Social People's Service, Conservative People's Party, German-Hanoverian Party, German National People's Party, German People's Party, German Völkisch Freedom Party, German Workers' Party, National Socialist Freedom Movement
 German Empire: Christian Social Party, Free Conservative Party, German Conservative Party, German Fatherland Party, German Social Party    
 Ghana: Progress Party, United Gold Coast Convention, United Party
 Gibraltar: Party for the Autonomy of Gibraltar, Progressive Democratic Party
 Greece: 4th of August Party, Democratic Renewal, English Party, Freethinkers' Party, Front Line, Greek National Socialist Party, Greek Rally, Hellenic Front, Liberal Democratic Center, Movement of Free Citizens, National Alignment, National Democratic Party, National Democratic Union, National Party of Greece, National Political Union, National Radical Union, Nationalist Party, New Party, Party of Hellenism, Party of New Liberals, Patriotic Alliance, People's Party, Political Spring, Politically Independent Alignment, Progressive Party, Russian Party, United Nationalist Movement, Union of Royalists
 Greenland: Association of Candidates
 Guatemala: Institutional Republican Party, National Liberation Movement, Patriotic Party, Renewed Democratic Liberty
 Hong Kong: Co-operative Resources Centre, Democratic Alliance, Federation for the Stability of Hong Kong, Hong Kong Progressive Alliance, Liberal Democratic Federation of Hong Kong, New Hong Kong Alliance, Progressive Hong Kong Society
 Hungary: Arrow Cross Party, Christian Economic and Social Party, Christian National Party, Christian National Socialist Front, Conservative Party, Deák Party, Holy Crown Society, Hungarian Democratic Forum, Hungarian Democratic People's Party, Hungarian Freedom Party, Hungarian Justice and Life Party, Hungarian National Socialist Party, Liberal Party, Modern Hungary Movement, National Constitution Party, National Legitimist Party, National Party of Work, United Hungarian National Socialist Party, Unity Party
 Iceland: Citizens' Party, Liberal Party, Nationalist Party
 India: Bharatiya Jana Sangh
 Indonesia: Catholic Party, Indonesian Christian Party, Indonesian Muslim Awakening Party, Islamic Education Movement, Masyumi Party, Patriot Party
 Iran: Azure Party, Islamic Republican Party, Rastakhiz Party, SUMKA
 Ireland: Progressive Democrats
 Israel: Development and Peace, Free Centre, Gahal, General Zionists, Gesher, Hatzohar, Herut, Herut – The National Movement, Kach, Mekhora, Morasha, National Religious Party, Ometz, One Israel, Tehiya, Shlomtzion, Yamin Yisrael, Yisrael BaAliyah, Yiud
 Italy: Christian Democracy, Citizens' Union for South Tyrol, Forza Italia, Italian Nationalist Association, Italian Social Movement, National Alliance, National Fascist Party, Social Action, The Right, National Movement for Sovereignty
 Japan: Party for Future Generations, Sunrise Party, Japan Innovation Party, New Renaissance Party, Liberal League
 Empire of Japan: Rikken Seiyūkai, Kokumin Dōmei, Tōhōkai
 Korea (Japanese rule): Iljinhoe
 Latvia: All For Latvia!, Pērkonkrusts, Reform Party
 Liechtenstein: German National Movement in Liechtenstein
 Lithuania: Liberal and Centre Union, Lithuanian Nationalist Union
 Mexico: Mexican Democratic Party, National Synarchist Union
 Montenegro: Montenegrin Federalist Party
 Netherlands: General League of Roman Catholic Caucuses, Anti-Revolutionary Party, Catholic People's Party, Centre Democrats, Centre Party, Christian Historical Party, Christian Historical Union, Free Anti Revolutionary Party, Pim Fortuyn List, National Socialist Movement in the Netherlands, Reformatory Political Federation, Reformed Political League, Roman Catholic State Party
 New Zealand: New Zealand Reform Party, Social Credit Party
 Nicaragua: Nationalist Liberal Party
 Nigeria: Northern People's Congress
 Norway: Christian Unity Party, Nasjonal Samling
 Pakistan: Muslim League
 Peru: Revolutionary Union, Odriíst National Union
 Poland: National Democracy
 Portugal: Republican Union, Catholic Centre Party, National Republican Party, Republican Liberal Party, Reconstitution Party, Nationalist Republican Party, Union of Economic Interests, National Syndicalists, National Union
 Romania: Iron Guard
 Russia: Baltic Republican Party, Christian Democratic Party of Russia, Conceptual Party "Unity", Congress of Russian Communities, Conservative Party of Russia, Constitutional Democratic Party – Party of Popular Freedom, Democratic Choice of Russia, Democratic Choice of Russia – United Democrats, Democratic Union, Derzhava, For Women of Russia, Forward, Russia!, Front of National Revolutionary Action, Great Fatherland Party, Liberal Russia, Male State, Movement Against Illegal Immigration, Nashi, Nation and Freedom Committee, National Republican Party of Russia, National Socialist Russian Workers' Party, National Socialist Society, New Course — Automobile Russia, Northern Brotherhood, Oprichny Dvor, Our Home – Russia, Party of Economic Freedom, Peasant Party of Russia, People's Militia named after Minin and Pozharsky, People's National Party, People's Union, Popular Patriotic Party, Power to the People!, Right Cause, Russian Party, Russian Socialist Party, Russian Unity, Russians, Slavic Union, Russian All-National Union, Russian National Union, Russian National Unity, Union of Right Forces, Union of the Russian People, Unity
 Soviet Union: Liberal Democratic Party of the Soviet Union, Lithuanian Activist Front, VSKhSON
 Russian Empire: Party of Return to Serfdom, Russian Assembly, Russian Monarchist Union, Progressive Party, Union of October 17, Union of the Muslims of Russia, Union of the Russian People, United Nobility
 San Marino: Sammarinese Fascist Party
 Serbia: Chetniks, Party of Serbian Unity, Yugoslav Radical Union, G17 Plus, United Regions of Serbia
 Slovakia: Slovak People's Party, Slovak Democratic and Christian Union – Democratic Party
 South Africa: Conservative Party, Herstigte Nasionale Party, National Party, New National Party
 South Korea: Korea Independence Party, Liberal Party, Democratic Republican Party, Democratic Justice Party, United Liberal Democrats, Democratic Liberal Party, United Liberal Democrats, Liberty Forward Party, Pro-Park Coalition, Liberty Korea Party, New Conservative Party, Onward for Future 4.0, Bareunmirae Party, New Alternatives, Our Republican Party
 Spain: Moderate Party, Conservative Party, Traditionalist Communion, Spanish Patriotic Union, Popular Action, Spanish Renovation, Spanish Agrarian Party, Liberal Republican Right, Spanish Confederation of Autonomous Rights, FET y de las JONS, National Union, Popular Alliance 
 Sweden: Hats, New Democracy, Party of the Swedes, National Socialist Workers' Party
 Thailand: Thai Nation Party, Khana Ratsadon, Seri Manangkhasila Party
 Timor-Leste: Timorese Popular Democratic Association
 Togo: Rally of the Togolese People
 Turkey: Justice Party, Motherland Party, National Salvation Party, Virtue Party, Welfare Party
 Uganda: Kabaka Yekka
 United Kingdom: British Union of Fascists, Tory Party
 United States: American Nazi Party, Anti-Masonic Party, American Vegetarian Party, Dixiecrats, German American Bund, Know-Nothing Party, Modern Whig Party, National States' Rights Party
 Zimbabwe: Rhodesian Front

See also
 List of left-wing political parties
 List of centrist political parties
 List of syncretic political parties

Politics
Right-wing politics
Centre-right
Far right
Radical right (disambiguation)
Liberalism
Conservatism
Nationalism
Fascism

Parties
Christian Democratic Party
Centrist Democrat International
Conservative Party
International Democrat Union
National Front
National Party
People's Party

References

Conservatism-related lists